Anillomyrma decamera is an Asian species of ant in the subfamily Myrmicinae found from Philippines, India, Sri Lanka, Taiwan, Vietnam, and China.

Subspecies
 Anillomyrma decamera continentis Wheeler, W.M., 1927
 Anillomyrma decamera decamera (Emery, 1901)

References

External links

 at antwiki.org
Itis.gov
Animaldiversity.org

Myrmicinae
Hymenoptera of Asia
Insects described in 1901